El Disco de Tu Corazón is the third studio album by Argentine band Miranda!, released on April 1, 2007, by Pelo Music. Produced entirely by Cachorro López and composed by Alejandro Sergi, it is a post-disco, dub and pop rock record.

Background and composition 
According to Alejandro Sergi, on this record the band wanted to make songs that were different from those on Sin Restricciones, which were composed in major tones. "That gave it a more of a rowdy sound, but it was much more minimal in vocal production, here aesthetically it looks a little more like Es Mentira, the first album, which we made more grandiose, epic", he said.

Critical reception 
In a positive review, Página 12 journalist Natali Schejtman complimented El Disco de Tu Corazón for its "impeccable production" and its "neat and catchy sound". She also wrote that this is "a fun record that relies heavily on its ability to produce excitement and the victory of the heart over the mind", and praised its "infallible virtue of generating a total party".

Accolades

Track listing 
All songs written by Alejandro Sergi and produced by Cachorro López.

Credits and personnel 
Credits adapted from AllMusic.
 Alejandro Sergi – vocals, guitar, programming, composition
 Julianna Gattas – vocals
 Pelo Aprile – executive production
 Jose Blanco – mastering
 Leandro Fuentes – guitar
 Cachorro López – arrangement, production, bass
 Sebastián Schon – arrangement, engineer, programming
 Ernesto Snajer – acoustic guitar
 Cesar Sogbe – mixing
 Julieta Venegas – lead vocals (3)
 Olvido Gara – lead vocals (9)
 Nacho Canut – bass guitar, keyboards (9)
 Gabriel Lucena – mixing (13, 14, 15)
 Alejandro Ros – graphic design

Charts

Weekly charts

Year-end charts

References 

2007 albums
Spanish-language albums
Miranda! albums
Albums produced by Cachorro López